The Swallow Aeroplane Company Swallow is a series of American ultralight aircraft that was designed by Chet Fudge and  produced by the Swallow Aeroplane Company in the 1980s. The aircraft was supplied as a kit for amateur construction.

The Swallow Aeroplane Company should not be confused with the 1920s era Swallow Airplane Company.

Design and development
It features a cable-braced high-wing, a single-seat, open cockpit, tricycle landing gear and one or two engines in pusher configuration.

The aircraft is made from bolted-together aluminum tubing, with the flying surfaces covered in Dacron sailcloth. Its  span wing is cable-braced from an inverted "V" kingpost. The pilot is accommodated on an open seat, without a windshield. The aircraft controls are conventional three-axis. The engine or engines are mounted to the wing leading edge and drive the propeller, located at the trailing edge and in between the tail boom tubes, through an extension shaft. Some Swallows used an unusual tubular engine fairing.

Variants
Swallow A
Swallow B

Specifications (Swallow B)

References

External links
Photo of a Swallow B

1980s United States ultralight aircraft
Homebuilt aircraft
Single-engined tractor aircraft
Twin-engined single-prop tractor aircraft
Swallow